Good Trouble is the tenth studio album by REO Speedwagon, released in 1982 as a follow-up to Hi Infidelity. It peaked at #7 on the Billboard charts. The single "Keep the Fire Burnin'" gave the band a #7 hit on Billboards Pop Singles Chart and a #2 hit on the Mainstream Rock Tracks chart, their highest-charting hit on this chart.

In 2013, the album was released on CD by UK-based company Rock Candy Records, with expanded liner notes and photos.

Background and recording
REO Speedwagon lead vocalist/guitarist Kevin Cronin recalled, "After the huge success with Hi Infidelity... everyone was putting pressure on us to get back in the studio as quickly as we could to ensure we made the most of the situation. As I was the main writer, I was the person who had to get the songs done. But I told them I didn’t have enough of a good enough standard ready. I should have really stuck by my guns and refused to be badgered into recording until I was prepared. But in the end I went with the flow, and that was a mistake."

None of the songs from this album have been performed by the band in concert since 1983 except "Keep the Fire Burnin'", which was played as an acoustic version in their two shows at Valencia, Venezuela during the "Live As We Know It Tour '87," and has been played occasionally in more recent years. "The Key" was part of a five-song medley the band performed during their 2001 tour.

Track listing

Personnel

REO Speedwagon
 Kevin Cronin – lead and backing vocals (except on "Let's Be-Bop"), acoustic piano on "Keep the Fire Burnin'", acoustic and rhythm guitars
 Gary Richrath – electric guitar
 Neal Doughty – keyboards
 Bruce Hall – bass, lead vocals on "Girl with the Heart of Gold" and "Let's Be-Bop"
 Alan Gratzer – drums, tambourine

Additional personnel
 Steve Forman – chimes and crotales on "Sweet Time", shaker on "The Key"
 Tom Kelly – backing vocals
 Richard Page – backing vocals

Production 
 Kevin Beamish – producer, engineer 
 Kevin Cronin – producer, arrangements 
 Alan Gratzer – producer 
 Gary Richrath – producer 
 Bruce Barris – assistant engineer
 Tom Cummings – assistant engineer 
 Jeff Sanders – mastering 
 John Kosh – art direction, design 
 Ron Larson – art direction, design
 Aaron Rapoport – photography

Charts

Chart positions

Singles

Certifications

Notes 

REO Speedwagon albums
1982 albums
Epic Records albums
Albums produced by Kevin Beamish
Albums produced by Gary Richrath
Albums produced by Kevin Cronin